A tripoint is a geographical point at which the borders of three countries or regions meet.

Tripoint may also refer to:
Triple divide, a point where three drainage basins meet
Tri-point screw drive and head
Tripoint (novel), a 1994 work of science fiction by C. J. Cherryh

See also
Trig point
Triple point